Sir Henry Knyvet (1537–1598) of Charlton Park, Wiltshire, was an English Member of Parliament.

He was the eldest son of Sir Henry Knyvet, by his wife Anne, daughter and heiress of Sir Christopher Pickering of Killington, Cumbria, and widow of Sir Francis Weston. Sir Henry Knyvet was the grandson of Sir Thomas Knyvet and the brother of Thomas Knyvet. He succeeded his father in 1546.

He held a number of public offices and was appointed High Sheriff of Wiltshire (1578–79) and a deputy-lieutenant of Wiltshire. He was elected Member of Parliament for Wootton Bassett in 1571 and 1572, for Malmesbury in 1584 and 1586, Wootton Bassett again in 1589 and finally Malmesbury again in 1593 and 1597. He was knighted in 1574.

He married firstly in 1563, Elizabeth, the daughter and sole heiress of wealthy clothier Sir James Stumpe of Malmesbury, with whom he had two sons and four daughters. She brought him the manor of Charlton Park, where he commenced the building of Charlton House.

He married secondly, by June 1595, Mary, the daughter of Sir John Sydenham of Brinton, Somerset and the widow of John Fitz of Fitzford, Devon.

He was succeeded by his surviving three daughters, Katherine (who inherited Charlton Park and eventually became Countess of Suffolk), Elizabeth and Frances. All three married earls.

Frances Knyvet
His daughter, Frances Knyvet (died 1605) first married Sir William Bevill, and secondly, in 1602, Francis Manners, 6th Earl of Rutland. She danced in masques at the court of Anne of Denmark, including The Masque of Blackness as Notis on 6 January 1605. Her sister, Catherine, Countess of Suffolk, portrayed Kathare. Her daughter, Katherine Manners married the royal favourite, George Villiers, 1st Duke of Buckingham, in 1620. Frances Knyvet died of smallpox in the summer of 1605.

References

1537 births
1598 deaths
English MPs 1571
English MPs 1572–1583
English MPs 1584–1585
English MPs 1586–1587
English MPs 1589
English MPs 1593
English MPs 1597–1598
Knights Bachelor
High Sheriffs of Wiltshire